Nam Hye-seung (Korean: 남혜승) is a South Korean composer and music director. She is considered one of the best musicians in the country and is fluent in multiple musical instruments.

An award winning music director, she has stepped into the entertainment industry after graduating from one of South Korea's most prestigious universities, Yonsei University.

Filmography

References

External links 
   
 

Living people
South Korean film score composers
Year of birth missing (living people)